Asperula arvensis, known as blue woodruff, is a species of flowering plant in the family Rubiaceae. It belongs to the genus Asperula. It is native to most of Europe plus Algeria, Morocco, and southwest Asia from Turkey to Kyrgyzstan.

References

External links
World Checklist of Rubiaceae

arvensis
Flora of Europe
Flora of Morocco
Flora of Algeria
Flora of Lebanon
Flora of Iran
Flora of Kyrgyzstan
Flora of Russia
Flora of Iraq
Flora of Cyprus
Flora of Palestine (region)
Plants described in 1753
Taxa named by Carl Linnaeus